Caleb Williams (born November 18, 2001) is an American football quarterback for the USC Trojans. Williams played for the Oklahoma Sooners in 2021 before transferring to USC as a sophomore in 2022, where he won several player of the year awards, including the Heisman Trophy, after throwing for 4,075 yards with a school-record 47 total touchdowns; 37 passing and 10 rushing.

High school career
Williams attended Gonzaga College High School in Washington, D.C. As a sophomore in 2018 he led Gonzaga to a WCAC Championship as the best team in the District, and was named Washington Post All-Metropolitan 1st team and Washington, D.C. Gatorade Football Player of the Year after he passed for 2,624 passing yards with 26 touchdowns and rushed for 394 yards and 10 touchdowns. As a junior in 2019 he was named Washington Post All-Metropolitan 1st team for the second consecutive year after he passed for 1,770 yards with 19 touchdowns and rushed for 838 yards with 18 touchdowns. He was named the Elite 11 finals MVP the following summer. In 2020 his senior season was cancelled due to COVID-19. The highest-rated quarterback prospect of his class, Williams committed to play college football at the University of Oklahoma.

College career

Oklahoma
Williams entered his true freshman season at Oklahoma in 2021 as the backup to Spencer Rattler, before assuming the role as starting quarterback midway through the Sooners' rivalry game with the Texas Longhorns in the team's sixth game of the season. In that game, Oklahoma was down 17–35 before Williams replaced Rattler and led the Sooners to a 55–48 victory. He finished with 212 passing yards, 2 passing touchdowns, 88 yards rushing, and a rushing touchdown. Williams made his first start the following week, against Texas Christian University, and threw for 295 yards, four touchdowns and rushed for 66 yards and a rushing touchdown as Oklahoma won 52–31. In 7 games he finished his freshman year with 21 passing touchdowns, 6 rushing touchdowns, and 4 interceptions.

USC
On January 3, 2022, Williams entered the transfer portal, and on February 1, he announced that he had transferred to USC, reuniting him with head coach Lincoln Riley, who had been the head coach for the Sooners before being hired away by the Trojans the previous November. Williams was named the starter on August 25 and team captain on August 31. In his first start against Rice, he went 19/22 with 249 yards and two touchdowns, as USC won 66–14.

He became the  AP College Football Player of the Year, USC's first winner since Reggie Bush in 2005, and was named the 2022 Heisman trophy winner.

Statistics

References

External links
 
 
 USC Trojans bio
 Oklahoma Sooners bio
 Personal website

Living people
American football quarterbacks
Oklahoma Sooners football players
Players of American football from Washington, D.C.
USC Trojans football players
2001 births